The Hawaii Pacific Sharks are the 13 varsity athletic teams that represent Hawaii Pacific University, located in Honolulu, Hawaii, in NCAA Division II intercollegiate sports. The Sharks compete as members of the Pacific West Conference. Hawaii Pacific University's first venture into intercollegiate athletics came with the formation of the men's basketball team. The university previously competed in the NAIA before joining the NCAA in the mid-1990s.

On August 1, 2014, HPU athletics announced that they had changed their name from the Sea Warriors to the Sharks as part of a fundraising effort and to "better align ourselves with the rest of the university." As part of the new logo rollout, then-HPU Executive Athletics Director Vince Baldemor promised to secure 1,000 memberships in the HPU "Sharks Club" within the first three months. The program was a major failure with membership failing to exceed 300 after two years. Baldemor was relieved as athletics director.

History

Men's basketball won the 1993 NAIA Division I men's basketball tournament with an 88–83 victory over Oklahoma Baptist University.

The school's most successful athletics program has been its women's volleyball team, which has won three national championships, one NAIA national volleyball championship in 1990 and two NCAA Women's DII Volleyball Championships in 1998 and 2000.

The Lady Sharks Softball team won the NCAA Division II Women's College World Series on May 31, 2010 with a come-from-behind 4–3 win over Valdosta State University.

Although not recognized as an official sport by the athletic department, HPU has an internationally recognized Division II cheerleading and dance team. The HPU Large Coed, Small Coed, All Girl and Dance  National Championship Titles have established Hawaii Pacific as a global leader in collegiate competitive cheerleading. Including eight consecutive (Non-NCAA) National Championship from 2003 to 2010.

National championships

Team

Varsity sports

Teams

Men's sports
 Baseball
 Basketball
 Cross Country
 Golf
 Soccer
 Tennis

Women's sports
 Acro and Tumbling
 Basketball
 Cross Country
 Golf
 Soccer
 Softball
 Tennis
 Volleyball

References

External links